Idose is a hexose, a six carbon monosaccharide. It has an aldehyde group and is an aldose. It is not found in nature, but its uronic acid, iduronic acid, is important. It is a component of dermatan sulfate and heparan sulfate, which are glycosaminoglycans. The first and third hydroxyls point the opposite way from the second and fourth. It is made by aldol condensation of D- and L-glyceraldehyde. L-Idose is a C-5 epimer of D-glucose.

References

Aldohexoses